Delaware Township is a township in Northumberland County, Pennsylvania, United States. The population at the 2010 Census was 4,489, an increase over the figure of 4,341 tabulated in 2000.

History
The Allenwood River Bridge, Hopper-Snyder Homestead, William Kirk House, and Warrior Run Presbyterian Church are listed on the National Register of Historic Places.

Geography

Demographics

As of the census of 2000, there were 4,341 people, 1,678 households, and 1,241 families residing in the township.  The population density was 142.6 people per square mile (55.1/km2).  There were 1,765 housing units at an average density of 58.0/sq mi (22.4/km2).  The racial makeup of the township was 98.80% White, 0.28% African American, 0.18% Native American, 0.23% Asian, 0.02% Pacific Islander, 0.14% from other races, and 0.35% from two or more races. Hispanic or Latino of any race were 0.53% of the population.

There were 1,678 households, out of which 31.6% had children under the age of 18 living with them, 63.1% were married couples living together, 7.1% had a female householder with no husband present, and 26.0% were non-families. 21.5% of all households were made up of individuals, and 9.8% had someone living alone who was 65 years of age or older.  The average household size was 2.58 and the average family size was 2.98.

In the township the population was spread out, with 24.5% under the age of 18, 7.0% from 18 to 24, 29.1% from 25 to 44, 25.3% from 45 to 64, and 14.2% who were 65 years of age or older.  The median age was 39 years. For every 100 females, there were 96.9 males.  For every 100 females age 18 and over, there were 94.7 males.

The median income for a household in the township was $39,219, and the median income for a family was $45,950. Males had a median income of $30,138 versus $21,417 for females. The per capita income for the township was $17,442.  About 7.0% of families and 10.7% of the population were below the poverty line, including 12.2% of those under age 18 and 16.1% of those age 65 or over.

References

Populated places established in 1774
Townships in Northumberland County, Pennsylvania
Townships in Pennsylvania